Juan Luis Mora Palacios (born 12 July 1973) is a Spanish retired professional footballer who played as a goalkeeper.

He appeared in 238 La Liga games over 13 seasons (17 overall as a professional), mostly with Oviedo.

Club career
Born in Aranjuez, Community of Madrid, Mora made his professional debut with Real Oviedo during 1993–94, and was the undisputed first-choice the following three seasons. He signed for RCD Espanyol in 1999, then spent 2002–03 and the following campaign in Segunda División, with Xerez CD and Levante UD respectively.

Mora played all 38 league matches in 2004–05's top flight with Levante, as his team was relegated in the last matchday. He subsequently joined Valencia CF on a three-year deal, being third choice behind Santiago Cañizares and Ludovic Butelle first and Cañizares and Timo Hildebrand afterwards (Cañizares was axed from the squad in December 2007, but reinstated in April following Ronald Koeman's firing), appearing in only three La Liga games during his spell; he left the Mestalla Stadium after his contract expired, at the end of the 2007–08 season.

On 15 August 2008, 35-year-old Mora returned to Levante, recently relegated to the second level. He served as backup in his debut campaign, and took part in no competitive matches in the second as the Valencian Community side returned to the top tier after a two-year absence; he retired shortly after, remaining with the club in directorial capacities.

International career
Mora appeared for the Spanish under-21s in the 1996 UEFA European Championship, and played Olympic football the same year.

Honours
Espanyol
Copa del Rey: 1999–2000

Levante
Segunda División: 2003–04

Valencia
Copa del Rey: 2007–08

Spain U21
UEFA European Under-21 Championship runner-up: 1996

References

External links

1973 births
Living people
People from Aranjuez
Spanish footballers
Footballers from the Community of Madrid
Association football goalkeepers
La Liga players
Segunda División players
Segunda División B players
Real Oviedo Vetusta players
Real Oviedo players
RCD Espanyol footballers
Xerez CD footballers
Levante UD footballers
Valencia CF players
Spain under-21 international footballers
Spain under-23 international footballers
Olympic footballers of Spain
Footballers at the 1996 Summer Olympics